Guntur Municipal Corporation (GMC) is the civic body that governs the city of Guntur in the Indian state of Andhra Pradesh.

History
The Guntur Municipality was created on 1 April 1888. It was named as a selection grade municipality in 1960 and to corporation in 1981. In 1985 Gunadala, Patamata and Bhavanipuram village panchayats, Payakapuram, Kundavari Kandrika were merged in the corporation.

Administration 

The Corporation is administered by an elected body headed by the Mayor. The corporation population as per the 2011 census was 1,039,518 with 527,307 males and a female population of 512,211. The present mayor is Koneru Sreedhar and the municipal commissioner is Sri Prasanna Venkatesh, I.A.S .

Civic services 

The corporation provides protected drinking water to its public and is the forerunner in the state with every day supply of  water to the city residents. The other services undertaken by the corporation authorities are: Internal roads extension; under ground drainage project with JNNURM; solid waste management which is recycled at waste to energy plants for power production; Health centers; Maternity hospitals; schools from elementary to high schools and even providing midday meals to students.

The Krishna river, groundwater and overhead tanks are the source of drinking water for the city residents. The underground and open draining systems are implemented for wastewater. There are also sewage treatment plants and the Budameru, Gundutippa, Islampeta and HB drains are utilized for draining out waste water. The Railway dumping yard is utilized for solid waste dumping and some of the solid waste produced is made useful by converting them into manures. There are a total of 32,262 Street lights in Corporation's area.

Infrastructure 

Certain municipal sporting infrastructure in the city are maintained by the corporation, which includes, Indira Gandhi Stadium, indoor stadiums, swimming pools and Gymnasiums. There are parks and open spaces as part of city greenery projects.

Awards and achievements 
Accolades and awards won by VMC include:
 National Urban Water Award (2009)
 CRISIL Best Practices Award for the "Siti e-Governance" Project
 CSI Nihilent runner-up award was conferred by Ministry of Information and Technology
 Stockholm Challenge Award finalist
 ISO 9001 Certified for Quality Management System

See also 
List of municipal corporations in India#Andhra Pradesh

References 

2021 local elections in Andhra Pradesh
Government of Guntur
Guntur